Bonnyrigg Rose Athletic Football Club is a Scottish football club from the town of Bonnyrigg, Midlothian.

Their home ground is New Dundas Park, and they have traditionally played in red and white hoops. They have won the Scottish Junior Cup twice, in 1966 and in 1978, as well as finishing runners-up in 1972. Their 6–1 defeat of Whitburn in 1966 is a joint record margin of victory in a Scottish Junior Cup final. Bonnyrigg won the East Region Super League championship four times during their membership, making them the league's most successful side.

At a special general meeting held in March 2018, the club's members voted in favour of applying to join the senior East of Scotland Football League. Bonnyrigg were part of a larger movement of eastern junior clubs to the East of Scotland League that year. In 2019, they won promotion to the Lowland League and successfully applied for Scottish Football Association membership. In 2022, they won promotion to Scottish League Two, thus entering the Scottish Professional Football League for the first time.

Scottish Cup

Prior to becoming an SFA member in 2019, Bonnyrigg qualified to enter the senior Scottish Cup by winning the East Superleague on four occasions.

In their first campaign in 2009–10, Bonnyrigg lost in their opening tie to Highland League club Fraserburgh. Better results were achieved in 2012–13, losing to SFL Second Division side Brechin City in a third round replay after wins over Girvan and Stirling University.

The third Scottish Cup adventure in 2016–17 was their most fruitful. Rose easily saw off Glasgow University and then defeated Burntisland Shipyard 14–0, the biggest win in the competition since 1984. This was followed by wins over Highland sides Turriff United and Cove Rangers. In a big shock, Bonnyrigg then eliminated Dumbarton of the Scottish Championship after a replay to progress to the Fourth Round. They were drawn at home against the cup holders Hibernian, with the match moved to Tynecastle Stadium in Edinburgh to accommodate the expected number of spectators and the basic facilities at New Dundas Park. The result, an 8–1 defeat, was a disappointing end to the run for the team and the 5000 fans who had travelled from Midlothian to give their support.

The club qualified again for the Scottish Cup in 2018–19, having won the East Superleague for a record fourth time. Now playing in the senior pyramid, this campaign ultimately ended in disappointment, losing 2–1 to Deveronvale in the first round. 2018 also saw the club take part in the inaugural Shaun Woodburn Memorial Cup, established in memory of former player Woodburn, who had been killed on the previous Hogmanay.

In June 2019, the club announced it had been accepted as a member of the Scottish Football Association, which would allow them to automatically qualify for the Scottish Cup annually. In their first Scottish Cup as a licensed team, Bonnyrigg would once again go on an impressive run, defeating Highland League sides Fraserburgh and Buckie Thistle before dispatching Scottish League One side Montrose 2–1 at New Dundas Park, despite being a man down. In the Fourth round, Bonnyrigg would again valiantly fight against a League One team, but could not repeat their heroics and lost 0–1 late on to Clyde.

Entering in the Second round in 2020–21, Bonnyrigg would defeat fellow Lowland Leaguers Bo'ness United 5–2, with Lee Currie scoring a hat-trick of penalties within 10 minutes of each other. In the next round, the Rosey Posey would nearly have a cup upset for the ages, with another Currie penalty and a brilliant performance from keeper Mark Weir nearly knocking out Scottish Championship side Dundee before a late equaliser sent the game to extra time. Currie again put Bonnyrigg ahead from the spot, but two goals by Dundee in the second half of extra time ended the dream.

Lowland League
Rose were promoted to the Lowland League in 2019 after winning the East of Scotland Football League and gaining SFA membership. They took the place of relegated Whitehill Welfare, based only two miles from Bonnyrigg in the village of Rosewell, Midlothian. After finishing 2nd and 3rd in their first two seasons, both curtailed by the COVID-19 pandemic, the following season they went on to win the league title in 2021–22.

Ground 

Bonnyrigg Rose play their home games at New Dundas Park, situated just off Dundas Street in the town centre.

Floodlights were installed in 2019.

Current squad 
As of 31 January 2023

On loan

Coaching staff
Manager: Robbie Horn
Assistant Manager: David Burrell
Goalkeeping Coach: Alex Connon
First Team Coach: Darren Smith
Strength & Conditioning Coach: Matthew Brown
Physio: Danielle McNaught

Managers
The team was managed from June 2015 by former Berwick Rangers player and assistant manager, Robbie Horn. Horn resigned in August 2017 to take over the vacant managerial position at Berwick. He later returned as manager in November 2018.

Season-by-season record

Senior

† Season curtailed due to COVID-19 pandemic.

Honours
Lowland League

 Champions: 2021–22

East of Scotland League
Champions: 2018–19
Conference B Winners: 2018–19

Scottish Junior Cup
Winners: 1965–66, 1977–78
Runners-up: 1971–72

SJFA East Region Super League
Winners: 2008–09, 2011–12, 2015–16, 2017–18
Runners-up: 2006–07, 2012–13, 2016–17

Other honours
Edinburgh & District League: 1937–38, 1963–64
East Region Division One: 1975–76, 1976–77, 1984–85
East of Scotland Junior Cup: 1897–98, 1962–63, 1985–86, 1986–87, 2002–03, 2005–06, 2012–13
Fife & Lothians Cup: 1981–82, 2004–05, 2006–07, 2017–18
Lanark & Lothians Cup: 1963–64, 1965–66
National Dryburgh Cup: 1985–86
East Region Division Two: 1983–84
East Junior League Cup: 1975–76, 1983–84, 1984–85, 1987–88, 2000–01
Brown Cup: 1933–34, 1963–64, 1973–74, 1977–78, 1985–86, 2004–05, 2005–06, 2006–07
St. Michaels Cup: 1965–66, 1970–71, 1974–75
RL Rae Cup: 1974–75
Peter Craigie Cup: 1992–93
Thornton Shield: 1955–56, 1956–57
Dalmeny Cup: 1922–23
Marshall Cup: 1913–14
Musselburgh Cup: 1909–10, 1924–25
Roseberry Charity Cup: 1937–38
Simpson Shield: 1905–06
Andy Kelly Memorial Cup: 2006

Notable former players
Per Bartram (F) (1978) Denmark international
Jim Begbie (D) (1968–1972) Represented Hong Kong League XI
Ally Brazil (D) (1992–1993) Scotland under-21 international
Sean Connery (early 1950s) future actor
Graham Harvey (F) (1998–1999) Represented Hong Kong League XI
Jim Hermiston (M) (1964–1965) Scotland under-23 international
Jimmy Mackay (M) (1961–1964) Represented Australia in the 1974 FIFA World Cup having scored the decisive goal in the final qualifier
Billy Neil (M) Made 186 Football League appearances for Millwall
Craig Paterson (D) (1977–1979) Scotland under-21 international and Scotland's most expensive player in 1982
Chris Robertson (F) (1990s) Scotland under-21 international
Pat Stanton (M) (1961–1963) 16 caps for Scotland
John White (M) (1955–1956) 22 caps for Scotland (3 goals)
Tommy White (F) Scotland under-23 international

References

External links
 Official club site

 
Football clubs in Scotland
Scottish Junior Football Association clubs
Football in Midlothian
Association football clubs established in 1890
1890 establishments in Scotland
East of Scotland Football League teams
Lowland Football League teams
Bonnyrigg and Lasswade